Runway end identifier lights (REIL) (ICAO identifies these as Runway Threshold Identification Lights) are installed at many airports to provide rapid and positive identification of the approach end of a particular runway. The system consists of a pair of synchronized flashing lights located laterally on each side of the runway threshold. REILs may be either omnidirectional or unidirectional facing the approach area. They are effective for:
 Identification of a runway surrounded by a preponderance of other lighting
 Identification of a runway which lacks contrast with surrounding terrain
 Identification of a runway during reduced visibility

The International Civil Aviation Organization (ICAO) recommends that:
 Runway threshold identification lights should be installed:
 at the threshold of a non-precision approach runway when additional threshold conspicuity is necessary or where it is not practicable to provide other approach lighting aids; and
 where a runway threshold is permanently displaced from the runway extremity or temporarily displaced from the normal position and additional threshold conspicuity is necessary.
 Runway threshold identification lights shall be located symmetrically about the runway centre line, in line with the threshold and approximately 10 meters outside each line of runway edge lights.
 Runway threshold identification lights should be flashing white lights with a flash frequency between 60 and 120 per minute.
 The lights shall be visible only in the direction of approach to the runway.

References

External links
 FAA Aeronautical Information Manual

Airport lighting